Alkem Laboratories Limited is an Indian multinational pharmaceutical company headquartered in Mumbai, that manufactures and sells pharmaceutical generics, formulations and nutraceuticals in India and globally.

Company
Alkem set up its research and development facility for ANDA development at Taloja in 2003. In 2006 anti-infective drug Taxim of Alkem became the first anti-infective drug in the Indian pharmaceutical industry to cross 1,000 million in terms of domestic sales in India. In 2014 Clavam another drug from Alkem crossed 2,000 million mark in terms of domestic sales in India. 

In 2007 the company filed its first ANDA for drug Amlodipine which was approved in 2009. Alkem has developed a portfolio of 705 branded generic drugs, with 13 of the brands featured among the top 300 brands in India for the fiscal year 2015 and a portfolio of 705 brands in India in the six months ended 30 September 2015. Alkem have 21 manufacturing facilities, 19 in India and 2 in US. 5 of the facilities are US FDA, TGA, UK MHRA approved.

Acquisitions 
Alkem has 21 manufacturing facilities: 19 in India and 2 in the US. These 2 facilities in the US were acquired in 2012 and 2013 respectively. In 2014, Alkem acquired the "Clindac-A" brand in India from Galderma S.A. In 2015, Alkem acquired a formulation manufacturing facility in the US.

Governance and administration 
Samprada Singh was the founder and chairman emeritus of the company, he led and shaped Alkem what it is today, he had a B.Com. degree from Patna University. He was the 42nd richest person in India and a billionaire. His brother, Basudeo Narayan Singh, was also the co-founder of the company. Samprada Singh died on 27 July 2019 at the age of 94 years after a brief illness in Mumbai.

References

External links
 

Pharmaceutical companies of India
Manufacturing companies based in Mumbai
Indian brands
Indian companies established in 1973
1973 establishments in Maharashtra
Pharmaceutical companies established in 1973
Companies listed on the National Stock Exchange of India
Companies listed on the Bombay Stock Exchange